The Plasma Science and Fusion Center (PSFC) at the Massachusetts Institute of Technology (MIT) is a university research center for the study of plasmas, fusion science and technology.

It was originally founded in 1976 as the Plasma Fusion Center (PFC) at the request and with the collaboration of the U.S. Department of Energy. The original grant was for construction and operation of a tokamak reactor Alcator A, the first in a series of small, high-field tokamaks, followed by Alcator C (1978) and Alcator C-Mod (1993).

MIT's most recent tokamak, Alcator C-Mod, ran from 1993 to 2016. In 2016, the project pressure reached 2.05 atmospheres—a 15 percent jump over the previous record of 1.77 atmospheres with a plasma temperature of 35 million degrees C, sustaining fusion for 2 seconds, yielding 600 trillion fusion reactions. The run involved a 5.7 tesla magnetic field. It reached this milestone on its final day of operation.

In 2018, the PSFC began developing a conceptual design for the SPARC tokamak in collaboration with Commonwealth Fusion Systems. SPARC intends to use new YBCO superconducting magnets in order to achieve net fusion energy in a compact device.

References

External links

PSFC homepage
Nuclear Science and Engineering homepage
New Record for Fusion (MIT News)
Alcator C-Mod pressure record: FAQ (PSFC News)

Plasma Science and Fusion Center
Plasma physics
Plasma physics facilities